Kathy Barker (born 1953) is a scientist/writer who focuses on science management and on communicating science to society. She authored At the Bench, which teaches laboratory practice to graduate students and postdoctoral fellows in the biomedical sciences, and At the Helm, which educates new principal investigators in laboratory management. She received a PhD in Biology from the University of Massachusetts Amherst and was a faculty member at The Rockefeller University before embarking on her writing career.

Kathy Barker currently explores scientists as activists at her blog, Scientists as Citizens, showing how scientists are using their training to improve the world beyond the bench.

References 

University of Massachusetts Amherst College of Natural Sciences alumni
Rockefeller University faculty
American science writers
Living people
1953 births
American scientists
20th-century American women writers
20th-century American non-fiction writers
21st-century American women writers
American women non-fiction writers
21st-century American non-fiction writers